{{Infobox Boxingmatch
| Fight Name    = The Rematch 
| fight date    = July 31, 2010
| image         =  
| location      = Mandalay Bay Resort & Casino, Paradise, Nevada, U.S.
| titles        = WBA (Super), WBO, and The Ring lightweight titles
| fighter1      = Juan Manuel Márquez 
| nickname1     = Dinamita("Dynamite")
| record1       = 50–5–1 (37 KO)
| hometown1     = Mexico City, Mexico
| height1       = 5 feet 7 inches
| weight1 = 133+1/2 lbs
| style1 = Orthodox
| recognition1  = WBA (Super), WBO, and The Ring lightweight champion  [[The Ring (magazine)|The Ring]] No. 3 ranked pound-for-pound fighter3-division world champion
| fighter2      = Juan Díaz
| nickname2     = Baby Bull
| record2       = 35–3 (17 KO)
| hometown2     = Houston, Texas, U.S.
| height2       = 5 feet 6 inches
| weight2 = 135 lbs
| style2 = Orthodox
| recognition2  = Former unified lightweight champion
| result        = Márquez wins via 12-round unanimous decision (116-112, 118-110, 117-111)
}}

Juan Manuel Márquez vs. Juan Díaz II, billed as The Rematch'', was a boxing lightweight bout for Márquez's WBA (Super), WBO, and The Ring lightweight championship. This fight is a rematch of the 2009 Fight of the Year, where Márquez knocked out Díaz in the 9th round.

Build up 
Juan Díaz was a 3-1 underdog for his rematch against Juan Manuel Márquez, but the Houston fighter employed unimpeachable logic to argue that he would be victorious before the battle.
In the rematch, Díaz, 26, intended to fine-tune rather than overhaul his game plan since he dictated the action and manhandled Márquez for much of the first fight before Márquez, 36, identified and exploited the chinks in his armour. Without revealing too much of his strategy, Díaz said his key to victory involved a delicate balance between brain, brawn, offense and defense.

Márquez, at 36 ten years older than his opponent, retained his WBO and WBA lightweight titles, and won this rematch by outpunching Díaz 288 to 155 on blows which connected. Márquez broke Díaz' lip to pieces with hard left jabs and hard overhand rights that scored, backing Díaz up during this bout. Márquez had a swollen right eye, but it was not a factor. The fight was a clean one. Díaz, a loser of four of his last six bouts, was studying for his law school entrance exam in preparation for a career change before the Márquez bout.

140 pound champion Amir Khan was in attendance and was mentioned as a possible future opponent for Márquez.
Also in attendance former Heavyweight Champions Mike Tyson and Lennox Lewis, current WBA Champion David Haye as well as Junior Middleweight Contender Alfredo Angulo.

The Fight
Prior to the bout, the WBO ordered the Márquez-Díaz winner to fight mandatory challenger Michael Katsidis. Márquez won the fight via unanimous decision by the official scores of 117-111, 116-112, and 118-110. After the Díaz rematch, Márquez stated that he was interested in pursuing a third fight with Manny Pacquiao. There was also the possibility of him moving up in weight again to face one of the belt-holders at 140 pounds: Timothy Bradley, Devon Alexander or Amir Khan, all of whom were fighting on HBO.

Results

Televised
Lightweight Championship bout:  Juan Manuel Márquez (c)   vs.  Juan Diaz
Márquez defeated Díaz via unanimous decision (116–112, 118–110, 117–111).
Light Welterweight bout:  Robert Guerrero vs.  Joel Casamayor
Guerrero defeated Casamayor via unanimous decision (98–89, 98–89, 97–90).
Middleweight Championship bout:  Dmitry Pirog vs.  Daniel Jacobs
Pirog defeated Jacobs via knockout at 0:57 of fifth round.
Lightweight bout:  Rocky Juarez vs.  Jorge Linares
Linares defeated Juarez via unanimous decision (99–90, 97–92, 99–90).

Televised Free
Light Welterweight bout:  Frankie Gomez vs.  Ronnie Peterson
Gómez defeated Peterson via technical knockout at 2:14 of first round.
Super Middleweight bout:  Sakio Bika vs.  Jean Paul Mendy
Mendy defeated Bika via disqualification (For hitting Mendy when he was down) at 1:15 of first round.

Untelevised
Super Middleweight bout:  Alfredo Contreras vs.  George Groves
Groves defeated Contreras via technical knockout at 0:48 of sixth round.
Heavyweight bout:  Seth Mitchell vs.  Derek Bryant
Mitchell defeated Bryant via technical knockout at 1:45 of first round.
Lightweight bout:  Juan Montiel vs.  Mike Peralta
Montiel defeated Peralta via unanimous decision (58–55, 60–53, 58–55).

Reported fight earnings
These are the payouts to the fighters as reported to the executive director of the Nevada State Athletic Commission Keith Kizer. These are the official purses as per the Nevada bout agreements, It does not include sponsor money or other common forms of revenue paid through other streams.

Juan Manuel Márquez $1,000,000 vs. Juan Díaz ($540,000)
Daniel Jacobs $200,000 vs. Dmitry Pirog ($50,000)
Roberto Guerrero $75,000 vs. Joel Casamayor ($50,000)
Rocky Juarez $45,000 vs. Jorge Linares ($30,000)
Sakio Bika $18,000 vs. Jean Paul Mendy ($12,000)

References

Boxing matches
2010 in boxing
Boxing in Las Vegas
2010 in sports in Nevada
Golden Boy Promotions
July 2010 sports events in the United States